Boldyrev (masculine) or Boldyreva (feminine) is a Russian surname. Notable people with the surname include:

Danylo Boldyrev (born 1992), Ukrainian speed climber
Vasily Boldyrev (1875–1933), Russian general
Vladimir Boldyrev (born 1949), Russian general
Elena Boldyreva (born 1961), Russian chemist and researcher

Russian-language surnames